Bucculatrix cirrhographa is a moth in the family Bucculatricidae. It is found in Ecuador. It was first described in 1915 by Edward Meyrick.

References

Natural History Museum Lepidoptera generic names catalog

Bucculatricidae
Moths described in 1915
Taxa named by Edward Meyrick
Moths of South America